Otto Andersson (7 May 1910 – 8 November 1977) was a Swedish football defender. During his career he made three appearances for the Sweden national team, and played at the 1936 Summer Olympics. His career in club football was spent in Örgryte IS.

Honours
 Allsvenskan:
 Runners-up (1): 1931–1932

External links

References 

Swedish footballers
Sweden international footballers
1934 FIFA World Cup players
1910 births
1977 deaths
Place of birth missing
Olympic footballers of Sweden
Footballers at the 1936 Summer Olympics
Association football defenders